The Larry Gomes Stadium, located in Malabar, Arima, Trinidad and Tobago, is named for West Indies cricketer Larry Gomes.  The stadium was constructed for the 2001 U-17 World Cup which was hosted by Trinidad and Tobago. It also hosted games from the 2010 FIFA U-17 Women's World Cup.

References

Football venues in Trinidad and Tobago
Arima